Stephen L. DiMauro (born September 3, 1957, in Philadelphia, Pennsylvania) is a retired American Thoroughbred racehorse trainer. 

The son of Eclipse Award winning trainer Stephen A. DiMauro, he grew up in the business, helping his father by walking hots plus grooming and galloping the stable's horses. Young Stephen studied at St. John's University for three years before returning to racing. In 1982 he took out his trainer's license while continuing to work with his father through 1990.

Stephen DiMauro was based in New York and New Jersey until 1994 when he moved his stable to Calder Racecourse in Miami Gardens, Florida. He got his 1,000 career win on November 23, 2013, at Gulfstream Park. He retired after the 2016 racing season.

References

	

1957 births
Living people
American horse trainers
Sportspeople from Philadelphia